Israel Washburn Jr. (June 6, 1813 – May 12, 1883) was a United States political figure who was the Governor of Maine from 1861 to 1863. Originally a member of the Whig Party, he later became a founding member of the Republican Party. In 1842, Washburn served in the Maine House of Representatives.

In 1854, angry over the passage of the Kansas-Nebraska Act, Washburn called a meeting of 30 members of the US House of Representatives to discuss forming what became the Republican Party. Republican gatherings had taken place in Wisconsin and Michigan earlier in the year, but Washburn's meeting was the first in the U.S. Capital, and among U.S. Congressmen. He was probably also the first politician of his rank to use the term "Republican", in a speech at Bangor, Maine on June 2, 1854. Washburn represented the district which included Bangor and the neighboring town of Orono, Maine, where he had his home and law office.

Biography
Born in 1813 in Livermore (in modern-day Maine, then a part of Massachusetts) to a prominent political family, Washburn spent his life in politics. He was
an unsuccessful candidate for the Thirty-first Congress in 1848; elected as a Whig to the Thirty-second and Thirty-third Congresses, as a Republican to the Thirty-fourth, Thirty-fifth, and Thirty-sixth Congresses. He served from March 4, 1851, to January 1, 1861, when he resigned, having been elected Governor.

He was Chairman of the Committee on Elections (Thirty-fourth Congress). He organized the Maine Republican Party from 1854 onward. He was the 29th Governor of Maine from 1861 to 1863. During the American Civil War, he helped recruit Federal troops from Maine. In 1862, he attended the Loyal War Governors' Conference in Altoona, Pennsylvania, which ultimately gave Abraham Lincoln support for his Emancipation Proclamation.

In 1863, Lincoln appointed Washburn Collector of the Port of Portland. He held this position until 1877. Washburn was elected a member of the American Antiquarian Society in 1882.

Washburn was the brother of Elihu B. Washburne, Cadwallader C. Washburn, William D. Washburn, Samuel Benjamin Washburn, and Charles Ames Washburn. He died in 1883 in Philadelphia, Pennsylvania. He is buried at the Mount Hope Cemetery in Bangor, Maine.

The town of Washburn, Maine is named in his honor.

Notes

References
 
 Hanson, Mary E. Hanson.:, In memoriam. Israel Washburn Jr: born June 5, 1813, died May 12, 1883 (1884).
 Gienapp, William E.:, The Origins of the Republican Party (Oxford, 1987), p. 89.

External links

 
 The Washburn Family

1813 births
1883 deaths
Governors of Maine
Members of the Maine House of Representatives
Politicians from Bangor, Maine
People from Livermore, Maine
American Protestants
Maine Whigs
Burials at Mount Hope Cemetery (Bangor, Maine)
19th-century Christian universalists
Washburn family
Union (American Civil War) state governors
Whig Party members of the United States House of Representatives
Republican Party members of the United States House of Representatives from Maine
Republican Party governors of Maine
People of Maine in the American Civil War
19th-century American politicians
Members of the American Antiquarian Society
Collectors of the Port of Portland (Maine)